Hedobia is a genus of beetles in the family Ptinidae native to Europe and the Near East. There are at least four described species in Hedobia.

Species
These four species belong to the genus Hedobia:
 Hedobia angulata Fall, 1905 i c g
 Hedobia granosa LeConte, 1874 i c g
 Hedobia pubescens (Olivier, 1790) g
 Hedobia semivittata Van Dyke, 1923 i c g
Data sources: i = ITIS, c = Catalogue of Life, g = GBIF, b = Bugguide.net

References

Further reading

 
 
 
 
 

Ptinidae